William J. Carson Jr. (born December 24, 1950) is an American politician. He is a Democratic member of the Delaware House of Representatives, representing District 28. He was elected in 2008 to replace Democrat Bruce Ennis, who had resigned to run for a seat in the Delaware Senate.

Carson graduated from Smyrna High School.

Electoral history
In 2008, Carson was unopposed in the general election, winning 7,198 votes.
In 2010, Carson won the general election with 4,534 votes (67.7%) against Republican nominee Karen Minner.
In 2012, Carson won the general election with 6,104 votes (71.1%) against Republican nominee Christopher Sylvester.
In 2014, Carson was unopposed in the general election, winning 3,490 votes.
In 2016, Carson was unopposed in the general election, winning 7,581 votes.
In 2018, Carson won the general election with 5,176 votes (68%) against Republican nominee Charlotte Middleton.

References

External links
Official page at the Delaware General Assembly
 

1950 births
Living people
Democratic Party members of the Delaware House of Representatives
21st-century American politicians
People from Dover, Delaware